Naomi Broady (born 28 February 1990) is a British former tennis player.

She won one WTA Tour doubles title, as well as nine singles titles and 20 doubles titles on the ITF Women's Circuit. On 7 March 2016, she reached her best singles ranking of world No. 76. On 22 May 2017, she peaked at No. 56 in the doubles rankings.

Background
Born in Stockport, Naomi Broady is a sister of tennis player Liam Broady and has another brother, Calum and a sister Emma. She attended Priestnall School. Broady began playing tennis at the age of seven and was the British Under-18 girls' champion in 2007.

Career

2004–2008: Junior Circuit
Broady competed on the junior ITF Circuit from January 2004 until June 2008. She won one singles title in April 2006 at the Sutton ITF Junior Tournament and lost in the quarterfinals of four others, one of which was the 2008 Wimbledon girls' tournament, where she was beaten by Noppawan Lertcheewakarn of Thailand. She had a singles win–loss record of 21–13.

In junior doubles, Broady never won a title but reached the semifinals in one tournament and the quarterfinals in four others. In 2007, she and Tara Moore teamed up to compete in Wimbledon doubles, reaching the second round and Broady reached the same stage of Wimbledon doubles one year later partnering Jade Windley. Her final doubles win–loss record was 11–15 and her career-high combined ranking was world number 251 (achieved 7 July 2008).

2005–2007
Broady began playing on adult ITF tournaments in January 2005, but was unable to qualify for any of the five tournaments she entered. As a result, she finished the year without a world ranking.

She continued playing on the ITF Women's Circuit in 2006 but did not pass round two of any tournament until November, when she reached the quarterfinals of the $10k event in Sunderland, where she lost to Martina Pavelec. Her first ever year-end ranking was world No. 1464.

Broady was again unable to progress past the second round of any tournament until August 2007 when she reached the quarterfinals of an ITF event in Cumberland, London, where Anna Smith beat her in three sets. She reached the semifinals of her final tournament in 2007, the Sunderland $10k tournament, losing to Christina Wheeler. Her 2007 year-end worldwide ranking was 713.

In September 2007, Broady and fellow British competitor, David Rice, were both suspended by the LTA for "unprofessional behaviour" and "lack of discipline" due to pictures posted on the social networking website Bebo. The pictures and various comments made on them were deemed to be supportive of a lifestyle of drinking and partying, and as such, both players had resources such as funding and coaching withdrawn. Their pages on Bebo were later shut down. Brendan Gallagher of The Daily Telegraph later commented that the photos were "comparatively tame" and "not the cleverest move for a wannabe tennis star but hardly scandalous behaviour for a 17-year-old." The actions of the LTA led to Broady refusing to play for the national team, a position she has maintained throughout her career. At the time of the action the LTA were aware of (and warned) several other junior players for their behaviour.

2008
A more promising start saw Broady reach the semifinals of her first ITF event of the year in Sunderland. She was beaten by Johanna Larsson, 6–4, 6–2. In February she reached the quarterfinals in Portimão, before losing to Nina Bratchikova. She made her debut on the WTA Tour in June at the Tier III Birmingham Classic qualifying tournament. She beat Andreja Klepač in the opening round before losing a hard-fought contest with Margit Rüütel in the second round. Her next tournament was another first for Broady: her first Grand Slam appearance in the qualifying draw of Wimbledon. She was beaten by Rika Fujiwara in the opening round. Following this she spent the rest of the season on the ITF circuit and reached three more quarterfinals, in Felixstowe ($25k), Cumberland ($10k) and Traralgon ($25k). Her end-of-year ranking was world No. 444.

2009
Broady reached the quarterfinals of the $10k event in Glasgow in January. She won her first adult title later that month in Grenoble, France. She was unseeded in this event but beat the No. 5 seed, Varvara Galanina, in the quarterfinals and the top seed, Youlia Fedossova, in the final. She did not drop a set throughout the tournament. In March, she reached another quarterfinal, this one in Bath; her performance moved her into the top 400 for the first time in her career. In June, she qualified for her first WTA main draw, at the Birmingham Classic. She held a match point against Alla Kudryavtseva before going down during a rain delayed match which was held over two days. She was defeated at the Eastbourne International by Katie O'Brien and in the second round of qualifying at Wimbledon. She got injured and didn't play again until a $25k event in Mexico. She won the tournament to cap off the best week in her career. The week after she won a $10k event in Cuba.

2014

Following a successful early half to the season, which included tournament wins in Sharm El Sheikh, Namangan, and Fukuoka, it was announced that Broady would receive a wildcard into the main draw of Wimbledon. She recorded her first ever Grand Slam match win, coming from a set down to defeat world No. 92, Tímea Babos. Her run was ended in the second round, losing to former world No. 1, Caroline Wozniacki, in straight sets. However, partnering Neal Skupski, she reached the quarterfinals in mixed doubles.

2015
The start of the new season was lacklustre, with only a few semifinal-appearances at ITF events. She did however achieve her first win on clay since 2011 in qualifying for the French Open, but lost in the second qualifying round to Anastasia Rodionova. The grass-court season started well for her, reaching the semifinals of Surbiton Trophy and achieving her first win of the season over a top-100 player by defeating Ajla Tomljanović at the Birmingham Classic in round one before losing to Simona Halep in the next round. Broady also failed to defend her second-round points at Wimbledon, losing in straight sets to Mariana Duque.

Broady's season picked up however during on the American hardcourts. She qualified for the main draw of the Washington Open. There she defeated Jarmila Gajdošová in three sets and achieved her first win in the main draw of a WTA event outside of a British grass event. However, she lost to Ekaterina Makarova in her next match. She then won her first title of the season at a $25k event in Landisville, where she defeated American player Robin Anderson in the final.

Broady attempted to qualify for the US Open, but lost in the final round to Anett Kontaveit. She next entered the Tournoi de Québec where she again lost in the final qualifying round but received a lucky loser entrance into the main draw. There she fought her way to her first semifinal of a WTA event, before ultimately losing to the young Latvian player Jeļena Ostapenko. It was during this period during the U.S. hardcourt season that it became clear that playing aggressive in return games and using her big serve could make it difficult for her opponents to break her. For example, in her match at Washington against Jarmila Gajdošová, she served 19 aces, which was the fourth highest number of aces in a match on the 2015 WTA Tour.

Broady went on to reach the final of the Coleman Vision Championships, where she lost in an close match Michaëlla Krajicek. She had two match points in the third set, but failed to close it out. She also hit 28 aces in this match, which was very close to breaking the record on the ITF Circuit for a female player. After this loss, Broady reached a career-high ranking of 116.

2016
Broady began 2016 at the Auckland Open where she defeated Laura Siegemund, Kateryna Kozlova, and Magdaléna Rybáriková in the qualifying. In the first round of the main draw, she recorded the biggest win of her career when she shocked No. 2 seed Ana Ivanovic. Broady's second-round contest with Jeļena Ostapenko featured a controversial incident during a second-set tiebreak, when Ostapenko seemed to fling her racket in the direction of the back of the court, which subsequently hit a ball boy. Although the boy wasn't injured, Broady approached the chair umpire to enquire why Ostapenko had not been defaulted, on the grounds that the racket had been thrown in frustration and not in an accidental fashion. Ostapenko claimed that she did not fling the racket but that it was an accident. After hailing the WTA supervisor, Ostapenko was issued a code violation and would go on to lose to Broady in three sets. A cold post-match handshake was also met with further drama, as the two verbally berated each other in an argument while packing their bags. Broady went out in the next round when she lost to Sloane Stephens for a spot in the semifinals.

Having been eliminated in the opening round of qualifying at the Australian Open, Broady travelled to the United States to play the ITF events in Maui and Midland. Broady reached the semifinals in Hawaii before losing to top seed Christina McHale, but went two better by winning the $100k event in Midland, beating US youngster Robin Anderson in the final. Broady broke into the world's top 100 for the first time following these results.

Broady's next event was the qualifying of the high-value Premier-5 event in Doha. She won her opening match, but then lost in final qualifying to Elena Vesnina. From here Broady moved on to Kuala Lumpur. She recorded wins over Klára Koukalová, Yang Zhaoxuan and former Wimbledon finalist Sabine Lisicki to reach her second WTA semifinal, exiting at that stage to another former Wimbledon runner-up, Eugenie Bouchard. This run lifted Broady to a new career high ranking of 76.

2017–2021
Competing at the 2017 Midland Classic, Broady reached the singles final before losing in three sets to Tatjana Maria. In May, at the Empire Slovak Open, partnering with Heather Watson, Broady won the doubles competition on clay in two sets, bringing her doubles ranking to a new high of 56.

She lost in the first round of the 2018 Wimbledon Championships as a wildcard entry. This was her fifth first-round Wimbledon loss from six wildcard direct entries.

Broady worked as a commentator on Radio Five Live for the 2021 US Open.

Playing style
Broady's big serve is the stand out feature of her game. Her tactic is to dominate opponents with her serve, making it impossible for them to break her, and then to try to get a break herself. Off the ground she uses a one-handed backhand which can be very powerful but also breaks down easily. During rallies, Naomi hits powerful flat groundstrokes off both wings. She can also hit slice shots when on the defensive. She will often try to approach the net and volley to avoid long rallies.

WTA career finals

Doubles: 2 (1 title, 1 runner-up)

WTA Challenger finals

Doubles: 2 (2 runner-ups)

ITF Circuit finals

Singles: 19 (9 titles, 10 runner–ups)

Doubles: 35 (20 titles, 15 runner–ups)

Grand Slam singles performance timeline

References

External links

 
 
 Naomi Broady at the Lawn Tennis Association

1990 births
Living people
Sportspeople from Stockport
British female tennis players
English female tennis players
Tennis people from Greater Manchester